Derwentia was a genus of flowering plants that is endemic to Australia.
The genus was formerly included in the family Scrophulariaceae, but is currently included in Plantaginaceae, and is treated as a synonym of the genus Veronica.

All species are currently placed in the genus Veronica  as follows:
Derwentia arcuata B.G.Briggs & Ehrend. → Veronica arcuata (B.G.Briggs & Ehrend.) B.G.Briggs 
Derwentia arenaria (A.Cunn. ex Benth. ) B.G.Briggs & Ehrend → Veronica arenaria A.Cunn. ex Benth. .
Derwentia blakelyi B.G.Briggs & Ehrend. → Veronica blakelyi  (B.G.Briggs & Ehrend.) B.G.Briggs  
Derwentia decorosa  (F.Muell.) B.G.Briggs & Ehrend. → Veronica decorosa  F.Muell. 
Derwentia derwentiana (Andrews) B.G.Briggs & Ehrend. → Veronica derwentiana Andrews
Derwentia formosa (R.Br.) Bayly → Veronica formosa R.Br. 
Derwentia nivea (Lindl.) B.G.Briggs & Ehrend. → Veronica nivea Lindl.
Derwentia perfoliata (R.Br.) Raf. → Veronica perfoliata R.Br. 
Derwentia velutina B.G.Briggs & Ehrend. → Veronica velutina (B.G.Briggs & Ehrend.) B.G.Briggs

References

External links
Genus Derwentia (New South Wales Flora Online)

Veronica (plant)
Historically recognized angiosperm genera
Plantaginaceae genera
Taxa named by Constantine Samuel Rafinesque